Rajesh Khanna (born Jatin Khanna; 29 December 1942  18 July 2012) was an Indian actor, politician and film producer who is known for his work in Hindi cinema. During his career, he appeared in more than 180 films. He starred in 15 consecutive solo hit films from 1969 to 1971. He won the Filmfare Award for Best Actor three times and the BFJA Awards for Best Actor (Hindi) four times, received the Filmfare Special Award in 1991, and was awarded the Filmfare Lifetime Achievement Award in 2005. Khanna has been called the "First Superstar" of Indian cinema and was the highest paid Indian actor from 1970 to 1987 whereas Amitabh Bachchan shared the same tag with Khanna from 1980 to 1987.

Filmography

Films

Television

References

External links 

Indian filmographies
Male actor filmographies
Filmography